2 Field Engineer Regiment SAEC is a regiment of the South African Engineer Corps. The unit is based in Bethlehem, Free State. The role of the unit is to maintain mobility and serviceability of own forces and counter mobility of enemy forces. Tasks include bridging, water purification, obstacles, demolition, infrastructure repair and development.

History

Origin
2 Field Engineer Regiment was formed in 1946 and disbanded in 1958 until, in 1962 the Regular Force was formed with 17 Field Squadron for support.

Training
2 Field Engineer moved to Bethlehem in 1967 as a training unit and finally in 1974 it was renamed 2 Field Engineer Regiment consisting of 21, 22 and 23 Field Squadrons with 24 and 25 Field Squadrons as additional support for the operational area of South West Africa.

Insignia

Previous Insignia

Function

The main function of 2 Field Engineer Regiment is to provide mobility to, and ensuring the survivability of the landward forces of the SANDF, and to deny the mobility of the enemy when needed. 
This is done through:
 mine warfare, 
 water purification, 
 bridge building, 
 demolitions, 
 basic field engineering, 
 obstacles, 
 defensive works and 
 watermanship.

References 

Engineer regiments of South Africa
Military units and formations established in 1946